The Barney Allis Plaza is a park located in Downtown Kansas City, Missouri at the intersection of 12th Street and Wyandotte.  It is named after the prominent Kansas City hotelier, and owner of the Standard Theater, Barney Allis.

From April 11 2006 until 2011, it was the home of the Kansas City Explorers, Kansas City's World TeamTennis.

The Kansas City Sports Walk of Stars can be found on the edge of this park.  The Walk was constructed in 1991, and the first three polished granite slabs bore the names of inductees George Brett, Len Dawson and Tom Watson. The Walk is officially recognized by the city, and has used its common-law trademark since 1993.

The park is sandwiched in between the Municipal Auditorium and the Marriott Hotel, just down the road from the Library District. The Kansas City Convention Center is also located to the West of the plaza.

See also
Kansas City Royals award winners and league leaders#Kansas City Sports Walk of Stars

References

External links
 Barney Allis Plaza at CityGuide

Sports venues in Missouri
Tennis in Missouri
Sports venues in Kansas City, Missouri